μ Mensae, Latinized as Mu Mensae, is a solitary, blue-white hued star in the southern constellation of Mensa. With an apparent visual magnitude of 5.54, it is just bright enough to be faintly visible to the naked eye. Based upon an annual parallax shift of 6.8405 mas as seen from GAIA, this star is located roughly 477 light years from the Sun. At that distance, the visual magnitude is diminished by an extinction factor of 0.09 due to interstellar dust.

The stellar classification of  suggests that it is a B-type star with a spectrum that shows mixed traits of a giant and a bright giant star. It may be chemically peculiar with an overabundance of silicon in its outer atmosphere. The estimated radius of the star is 3.3 times that of the Sun. It is radiating 216 times the Sun's luminosity from its photosphere at an effective temperature of 12,550 K.

References

B-type giants
B-type bright giants
Ap stars
Mensa (constellation)
Durchmusterung objects
030612
021949
1541